"Runnin' with the Wind" is a song co-written and recorded by American country music artist Eddie Rabbitt.  It was released in April 1990 as the second single from the album Jersey Boy.  The song reached number 8 on the Billboard Hot Country Singles & Tracks chart.  It was written by Rabbitt and Reed Nielsen.

Chart performance

Year-end charts

References

1990 singles
1990 songs
Eddie Rabbitt songs
Songs written by Eddie Rabbitt
Songs written by Reed Nielsen
Song recordings produced by Richard Landis
Capitol Records Nashville singles
Songs about truck driving